Matti Tuomi (18 August 1925 – 30 June 2013) was a Finnish speed skater. He competed in two events at the 1952 Winter Olympics.

References

External links
 

1925 births
2013 deaths
Finnish male speed skaters
Olympic speed skaters of Finland
Speed skaters at the 1952 Winter Olympics
People from Hämeenlinna
Sportspeople from Kanta-Häme